Bihari Muslims are adherents of Islam who identify linguistically, culturally, and genealogically as Biharis. They are geographically native to the region comprising the Bihar state of India, although there are significantly large communities of Bihari Muslims living elsewhere in the Indian subcontinent due to the Partition of British India in 1947, which prompted the community to migrate en masse from Bihar to East Pakistan.

Bihari Muslims make up a significant minority in Pakistan under the diverse community of Muhajirs, and largely began arriving in the country following the Bangladesh Liberation War of 1971, which led to the secession of East Pakistan from the Pakistani union as the independent state of Bangladesh. Since 1971, Bihari Muslims residing in Bangladesh are widely referred to as Stranded Pakistanis in Bangladesh who are awaiting repatriation to Pakistan, and have faced heightened persecution in the country due to their collaboration with West Pakistani forces in perpetrating the 1971 Bangladesh genocide against Bengalis and Hindus.

The majority of Bihari Muslims adhere to the Sunni branch of Islam and the adoption of the religion by Biharis traces back to the 14th century, when Afghan traders and Sufi missionaries began to arrive in the region a century prior to the Mughal Empire's conquest of the subcontinent. There are also a significant minority of Biharis who adhere to the Shia branch of Islam, largely residing in Patna and Gopalpur in Siwan district, tracing their religious descent to Shia Muslim settlers of distant Persian ancestry from Lucknow in neighbouring Uttar Pradesh, who arrived in the region during the 19th century.

History
 
The large-scale arrival of Muslims in Bihar began in the 14th century, when Afghan traders and Sufi saints-warriors settled in the South Bihar plains and furthered the process of agricultural colonisation while also spreading Islam among the local populace. Muslims were not the only new immigrants to Bihar during this period. Inscriptions in Bihar Sharif tell of a Sufi warrior by the name of Malik Ibrahim Bayu who came to Bihar and defeated the non-Hindu Kol tribe who had been oppressing the local Muslims. He conquered many Kol chiefdoms.

Some of the kings and chieftains of medieval Bihar were Muslim. The chieftaincy of Kharagpur Raj in modern-day Munger district was originally controlled by Hindu Rajputs. In 1615 after a failed rebellion by Raja Sangram Singh, his son, Toral Mal converted and he changed his name to Roz Afzun.

The Faujdars of Purnea (also known as the Nawabs of Purnea) created an autonomous territory for themselves under the leadership of Saif Khan and ruled in parts of Eastern Bihar in the early 1700s. They were engaged in a protracted conflict with the neighbouring Kingdom of Nepal.

Many Bihari Muslims migrated to Pakistan and Bangladesh (then East Pakistan) after independence in 1947.

Society

Bihari Muslim society has traditionally been divided by Non-Varna caste and clan affiliations. Muslims refer to these distinctions as Biradri and they are not as rigid as those followed by Brahminical Hindus, but intermarriage remains rare.
The neologism Ashraf socio-political groups are historic ruling upper class castes  and include groups like Pathans, Sayyid, Sheikh, Mallick and Mirza. The Pathans of Bihar are mostly the descendants of Pashtun settlers with some being descended from  local high-caste Bhumihar and Rajput converts who intermarried with the said ethnoreligious group. The Mirzas claim descent from the Mughals and are found mainly in the area around Darbhanga and Muzaffarpur.  Among the largest socio-political grouping under the neologism of so-called Ajlaf groups are the Ansaris who form 20% of the Muslim population in Bihar. Their traditional occupation is weaving.

Distribution by district 
The following table shows the Muslim population of Bihar by district:

Sum total of this table is 14,780,500 Muslims out of 83.0 million total population in 2001 census, hence Muslims were 16.5% of total population in Bihar. In 2011 census, total population grew to 103.9985 million, of which 16.9% or 17,557,809 were Muslims. During 2001–2011, Muslims grew by 33.433%, while non-Muslims grew by 23.537%. District-wise break up by religions for 2011 is not available.

Kishanganj is the only district in Bihar with a Muslim majority.

Muslim communities
Muslim Bhumihars
Pathans of Bihar
Kulhaiya
Sheikh of Bihar
Muslim Kayasths
Muslim Rajputs
Thakurai
Malkana
Khanzada
Shershahabadia
Malik clan (Bihar)
Abdal
Muslim Chhipi
Lal Begi
Turuk Pasi/Pashai
Sayyid/Syed
Chik
Kunjra
Sai
Muslim Rangrez
Pamaria/Sheikh Abbasi

In common with the rest of India, the Muslims in Bihar are largely descendants of native converts from various castes. The rise of the Indian Muslim population can be traced back to the early 12th century, with many conversions to Islam taking place during the rule of the Sur Empire, which had established its capital in Sasaram.

References

External links
 The Forgotten People: Bihari Refugees of Bangladesh, UCANews

Islam in India by location
Social groups of Pakistan

Social groups of Bihar
Muhajir communities
Partition of India